Pivalamide (2,2-dimethylpropanamide, or NDEPA), a simple amide substituted with a tert-butyl group having the chemical formula: tBu-CO-NH2. It is the amide of pivalic acid.

N-Pivalamide, is a functional group having the following chemical formula: tBu-CO-NH-R

References

Carboxamides
Tert-butyl compounds